Muhammad Naqi Mallick (born 12 July 1928) is a Pakistani cyclist. He competed at the 1948, 1952 and 1956 Summer Olympics.

References

External links
 

1928 births
Possibly living people
Pakistani male cyclists
Olympic cyclists of Pakistan
Cyclists at the 1948 Summer Olympics
Cyclists at the 1952 Summer Olympics
Cyclists at the 1956 Summer Olympics
Place of birth missing (living people)